Hamilton Field House is a 3,000 -seat multi-purposee on the campus of the University of Central Oklahoma (UCO) in Edmond, Oklahoma, and is home to the Central Oklahoma Bronchos men's and women's basketball teams, as well as volleyball, and wrestling.

History
It opened on January 8, 1965 when the Central Oklahoma men’s basketball team defeated intrastate rival Northeastern State University 64–52. Prior to this the Bronchos played in the much smaller Wantland Hall, which now serves as the university's physical education building. The 3,000-seat facility was renamed from Hamilton Field House in 1993 in honor of longtime coach and athletic director Dale E. Hamilton, the driving force in the building’s planning and construction.  It was previously known as Broncho Field House.  Hamilton Field House is also the home facility for the volleyball and wrestling teams. Numerous other events, including the university’s graduation ceremonies, are held in the building. The facility was renovated before the 2001-02 season, including chairback seats installed near the arena floor level.

References

College basketball venues in the United States
Central Oklahoma Bronchos basketball venues
Sports venues in Oklahoma
Indoor arenas in Oklahoma
Buildings and structures in Oklahoma County, Oklahoma
Central Oklahoma Bronchos men's basketball
Basketball venues in Oklahoma
1965 establishments in Oklahoma
Sports venues completed in 1965
College volleyball venues in the United States
College wrestling venues in the United States